Huffine is a surname. Notable people with the surname include:

Candice Huffine (born 1984), American model
Getty H. Huffine (1889–1947), American musician
Ken Huffine (1897–1977), American football player and coach

See also
Don Huffines (born 1958), American politician